Michael Buskermolen (born 2 March 1972) is a Dutch former professional footballer who played for AZ for his entire professional career.

Club career
He spent all of his sixteen-year career at AZ, initially appearing for first team in the 1990–91 campaign. Buskermolen is also called "Mr. AZ" for his ultimate faithfulness.

A left-sided midfielder, Buskermolen played 399 league games for AZ following his debut and later worked in AZ's youth department. His final appearance was as a substitute in the 5-0 defeat of RBC Roosendaal on February 7, 2006.

Personal life
Buskermolen has lived almost his entire life in the village of Kudelstaart, where his father grew roses.
After retiring as a player, Buskermolen coached the AZ youth teams until 2015, when he finally decided to leave the club and start his own football school in Kudelstaart.

References

See also 
One club man

1972 births
Living people
People from Kaag en Braassem
People from Aalsmeer
Dutch footballers
Association football midfielders
AZ Alkmaar players
Eredivisie players
Eerste Divisie players
Footballers from South Holland
Footballers from North Holland